The Miller Ree Creek Bridge is a historic bridge in Miller, South Dakota. It is a single-span Marsh rainbow arch concrete bridge, carrying 2nd Street over Ree Creek just west of the town. The bridge consists of two concrete arches, from which the floor supports are suspended. Built in 1914, this bridge is one of only three bridges of the type to survive in the state, and is the best-preserved of the three.

The bridge was listed on the National Register of Historic Places in 1988.

See also
National Register of Historic Places listings in Hand County, South Dakota
List of bridges on the National Register of Historic Places in South Dakota

References

Road bridges on the National Register of Historic Places in South Dakota
Bridges completed in 1914
Buildings and structures in Hand County, South Dakota
National Register of Historic Places in Hand County, South Dakota
1914 establishments in South Dakota
Concrete bridges in the United States
Arch bridges in the United States